|}

The Coral Cup is a Premier Handicap National Hunt hurdle race in Great Britain which is open to horses aged four years or older. It is run on the Old Course at Cheltenham over a distance of about 2 miles and 5 furlongs (4,225 metres), and during its running there are ten hurdles to be jumped. It is a handicap race, and it is scheduled to take place each year during the Cheltenham Festival in March.

The event was established in 1993, and it has been sponsored by Coral throughout its history. The inaugural winner, Olympian, was given a bonus prize of £50,000 for having won the Imperial Cup the previous weekend. The race was promoted to Grade 3 status in 1999 and was re-classified as a Premier Handicap from the 2023 running when Grade 3 status was renamed by the British Horseracing Authority.

There were high winds on the day of the planned running in 2008, so the Coral Cup was rescheduled and run on Cheltenham's New Course. The distance of the rearranged event was 2 miles and 4½ furlongs.

Records
Most successful horse:
 no horse has won this race more than once

Leading jockey (3 wins):
 Davy Russell – Naiad de Misselot (2008), Carlito Brigante (2011), Diamond King (2016)
 Barry Geraghty - Sky's The Limit (2006), Spirit River (2010), Dame De Compagnie (2020)

Leading trainer (4 wins):
 Nicky Henderson - Spirit River (2010), Whisper (2014), William Henry (2019), Dame De Compagnie (2020)

Winners
 Weights given in stones and pounds.

See also
 Horse racing in Great Britain
 List of British National Hunt races

References

 Racing Post:

 pedigreequery.com – Coral Cup Handicap Hurdle – Cheltenham.
 racenewsonline.co.uk – Racenews Archive (21 February 2008).

External links
 Race Recordings 

National Hunt races in Great Britain
Cheltenham Racecourse
National Hunt hurdle races
Recurring sporting events established in 1993
1993 establishments in England